Meilen is a railway station in the Swiss canton of Zürich, situated in the municipality of Meilen. The station is located on the Lake Zürich right bank railway line.

History 
The station was opened in 1893, at the same time as the Lake Zürich right bank line. 

In 1903, Meilen station became the interchange point with the Wetzikon-Meilen-Bahn (WMB), a newly built metre gauge electric tramway that served the Zürcher Oberland area inland from the lake. The WMB originally ran beyond Meilen station, to terminate at the lakeside, but this section closed in 1931 leaving the station as the line's terminus. The WMB closed in 1950.

Services 
The station is served by the following passenger trains:

A regional bus terminal is adjacent to the railway station, served by buses of the Verkehrsbetriebe Zürichsee und Oberland (VZO).

References

External links 

Meilen station on Swiss Federal Railway's web site

Railway stations in the canton of Zürich
Swiss Federal Railways stations